The Saturn Award for Best Performance by a Younger Actor is one of the annual awards given by the American professional organization the Academy of Science Fiction, Fantasy & Horror Films. The Saturn Awards are the oldest film-specialized awards to reward science fiction, fantasy, and horror achievements (the Hugo Award for Best Dramatic Presentation, awarded by the World Science Fiction Society who reward science fiction and fantasy in various media, is the oldest award for science fiction and fantasy films).

The category was first introduced for the 1984 film year, specifically to reward young actors and actresses in films, and was the first acting award of the Academy to reward both males and females. Tom Holland is the only actor to have won it three times, to have won it three years in a row, and to have won three times for the same role. Haley Joel Osment and Chloë Grace Moretz have each won the award twice. Moretz and Daniel Radcliffe have received the most nominations, with 5 each. Elijah Wood, Kirsten Dunst, and Tobey Maguire are the only actors to have won both Best Performance by a Younger Actor and later a Saturn Award for adults.

Winners and nominees

1980s

1990s

2000s

2010s

2020s

Multiple nominations
5 nominations
 Chloe Grace Moretz
 Daniel Radcliffe

4 nominations
 Freddie Highmore
 Tom Holland

3 nominations
 Corey Haim
 Christina Ricci
 Saoirse Ronan
 Millicent Simmonds
 Kodi Smit-McPhee
 Jacob Tremblay
 Elijah Wood

2 nominations
 Asa Butterfield
 Kirsten Dunst
 Alex Etel
 Elle Fanning
 Edward Furlong
 Lukas Haas
 Josh Hutcherson
 Justin Long
 Joshua John Miller
 Robert Oliveri
 Haley Joel Osment
 Jared Rushton
 Devon Sawa
 Ty Simpkins
 Jeremy Sumpter
 Jonathan Taylor Thomas
 Mara Wilson

Multiple wins
3 wins
 Tom Holland

2 wins
 Chloe Grace Moretz
 Haley Joel Osment

See also
Saturn Award for Best Performance by a Younger Actor in a Television Series

References

External links
Saturn Awards official website
Internet Movie Database: 12th, 13th, 14th, 15th, 16th, 17th, 18th, 19th, 20th, 21st, 22nd, 23rd, 24th, 25th, 26th, 27th, 28th, 29th, 30th, 31st, 32nd, 33rd, 34th, 35th, 36th, 37th, 38th, 39th, 40th, 41st, 42nd, 43rd

Younger Actor (film)
Awards for young actors